Below is list of achievements of, and records and trophies won by USM Alger. The club has won a total of 18 major trophies, including the national championship 7 times also won the Algerian Cup a record 8 times, the Algerian Super Cup 1 time, and the UAFA Club Cup 1 time Al Ittihad reached the CAF Champions League final for the first time in 2015 but was defeated against TP Mazembe. The club has also never been out of the top two divisions of Algerian football since entering the Football League.

Honors history
USM Alger is the third club in terms of titles in Algeria, after JS Kabylie and ES Setif with 18 major trophies, first title was immediately after independence by winning the league title in the final against neighbor MC Alger 3–0. After that, Al-Ittihad became a name in the Algerian Cup, which reached five consecutive times to the final between 1969 and 1973 and all of them were defeated, then they were defeated in two finalists in 1978 and 1980, A year after USM Alger won the first title in the Algerian Cup against ASM Oran 2–1 in a match that took place in the new Bel Abbas stadium, in the 1987–88 season the club returned to the first division with a young squad, mostly from Reserve team under the leadership of coach and former captain of the team Djamel Keddou, and despite the lack of experience, USM Alger managed to win the Algerian Cup for the second time after winning against CR Belouizdad with penalties at Stade 5 Juillet 1962 which is the fourth final between the two teams and the first victory for USMA after three defeats. In 1995–96 season after a great struggle with MC Oran for the title and in the last round USM Alger won the title after its victory against CS Constantine at Stade Mohamed Hamlaoui, with a difference of only two points, it is the first in 33 years and the second in its history. 

In 1996–97 Algerian Cup in the Round of 16 in a match that was expected against CS Constantine, but they withdrew and did not come to the stadium Where were they accused of collusion in order for USMA to facilitate its mission in the last round match of the National 1, then the road was not easy to reach the final where faced CA Batna and won by Tarek Ghoul goal. In 1998–99 Algerian Cup against JS Kabylie the two teams met for the first time in the final of the Algerian Cup at Stade 5 Juillet 1962 and in the first final to be attended by the new president of the country Abdelaziz Bouteflika and the honorary president of the club Saadi Yacef and ended with the victory of USM Alger with two goals scored by Billel Dziri and the former player in JS Kabylie Tarek Hadj Adlane To be the fourth Cup of USMA. In 2000–01 Algerian Cup facing CRB Mécheria from second division which is up for the first time to the final. the only goal of the game was scored by Hocine Achiou to achieve the fifth title, The match was almost postponed by stopping for more than ten minutes due to a power outage at the beginning of the first half. 

In 2002–03 It was the best season in the history of USM Alger, the journey towards achieving the title was not easy and the struggle was great with USM Blida, NA Hussein Dey and JS Kabylie, and USM Alger waited until the 28 round to celebrate the title second in a row after winning against ASM Oran. To complete the joy in the Algerian Cup by winning the title after the victory against CR Belouizdad after Moncef Ouichaoui scored the golden goal to achieve the double for the first time in its history. The seventh Algerian Cup was won in 2004 against JS Kabylie where USM Alger won by penalties. In 2004–05 The fifth league title was the last title for Saïd Allik as a president, with a big difference from the runner-up JS Kabylie reached 13 points. In the 2013 Algerian Cup Final against neighbor MC Alger in the Algiers Derby for the fifth time in history. USM Alger defeated of them with a goal scored by Mokhtar Benmoussa. USMA won its eighth title. Also this was the first time that Al Ittihad won against Mouloudia in the final after four defeats before. Two weeks later, USMA won its first Arab Club Champions Cup title after defeating Kuwait's Al-Arabi club 3–2 in aggregate in the 2012–13 UAFA Club Cup final. In the Super Cup USM Alger faced 2012–13 Ligue 1 champions ES Sétif and won the title for the first time. On May 26, 2019, And after the victory outside the home against CS Constantine 3–1 achieved the eighth Ligue 1 title, one point behind JS Kabylie.

Championships

League championships
Algerian Ligue Professionnelle 1
Champion (8): 1963, 1996, 2002, 2003, 2005, 2014, 2016, 2019
Runner-up (4): 1998, 2001, 2004, 2006

Domestic cups
Algerian Cup
Winner (8): 1981, 1988, 1997, 1999, 2001, 2003, 2004, 2013
Runner-up (9): 1969, 1970, 1971, 1972, 1973, 1978, 1980, 2006, 2007
Algerian Super Cup
Winner (2): 2013, 2016
Runner-up (3): 1981, 2014, 2019

International
CAF Champions League
Runner-up (1): 2015
UAFA Club Cup
Winner (1): 2013
Maghreb Cup Winners Cup
Runner-up (1): 1970

League participation
Algerian Ligue Professionnelle 1: 1963, 1964, 1965, 1970, 1971, 1972, 1975, 1976, 1977, 1978, 1979, 1980, 1982, 1983, 1988, 1989, 1990, 1996, 1997, 1998, 1999, 2000, 2001, 2002, 2003, 2004, 2005, 2006, 2007, 2008, 2009, 2010, 2011, 2012, 2013, 2014, 2015, 2016, 2017, 2018, 2019, 2020, 2021, 2022, 2023
Algerian Ligue Professionnelle 2: 1966, 1967, 1968, 1969, 1973, 1974, 1981, 1984, 1985, 1986, 1987, 1991, 1992, 1993, 1994, 1995
CAF Champions League: 1997, 2003, 2004, 2005, 2006, 2007, 2015, 2017, 2020

African achievements

Total standings of African Cup participations (1963 to 2021–22)

Pos. = Position; Pld = Matches played; W = Won; D = Drawn; L = Lost; GF = Goals for; GA = Goals against; Pa. = Participation; Pld = Matches played
CSC = CAF Super Cup; CCL = CAF Champions League; CCWC = CAF Cup Winners' Cup' Cup;
CAC = CAF Cup; CCC = CAF Confederation Cup

 CAF Champions League: 9 Appearances

1997 - Group Stage
2003 - Semi-Finals
2004 - Group Stage

2005 - Second Round
2006 - First Round
2007 - Preliminary Round

2015 - Finals
2017 - Semi-Finals
2019–20 - Group Stage

 CAF Confederation Cup: 4 Appearances

2005 - Play-off round
2013 - First Round

2018 - Quarter-Finals

2022–23 - In progress

 CAF Cup Winners' Cup: 5 Appearances

1982 - Quarter-Finals
1989 - Quarter-Finals

1998 - Quarter-Finals
2000 - Disqualified in First Round

2002 - Semi-Finals

 CAF Cup: 1 Appearance
1999 - Quarter-Finals

References

External links
 Official Site USMA dz

USM Alger